Hữu Lũng is a township (thị trấn) and capital of Hữu Lũng District, Lạng Sơn Province, Vietnam.

References

Populated places in Lạng Sơn province
Communes of Lạng Sơn province
District capitals in Vietnam
Townships in Vietnam